In God's Hands is a (1998) film by Zalman King released through Sheen Michaels Entertainment a production company created by actor Charlie Sheen and Bret Michaels. The basic story is of three young surfers on a roller coaster action tour of the globe's most exotic and dangerous surfing spots. They travel to Madagascar, Mexico, Bali and Hawaii seeking the ultimate wave, a 40-foot force of nature that travels at speeds up to 35 miles per hour.

Cast
 Shane Dorian as Shane (as Patrick Shane Dorian)
 Matt George as Mickey
 Matty Liu as Keoni
 Shaun Tomson as Wyatt
 Maylin Pultar as Serena
 Bret Michaels as Phillips
 Brion James as Captain
 Brian L. Keaulana as Brian Deegan
 Darrick Doerner as Darrick
 Pete Cabrinha as Pete
 Rush Randle as Rush
 Mike Stewart as Stewart
 Brock Little as Brock
 Tom Stern as Shane's Father
 Amy Hathaway as Girl on Train
 Camerina Arvizu as Maria

Soundtrack 
The film's theme song "Sane" was written by Yoshiki and performed by Violet UK.

Reception 
On Rotten Tomatoes the film has a 0% rating based on reviews from 6 critics. Matt George writing in Beach Grit described the film as "worst film ever made".

References

External links 
 

1998 films
American surfing films
1990s adventure films
American road movies
Films directed by Zalman King
1990s English-language films
1990s American films